George Musgrave FRSA is an academic studying the psychological experiences and working conditions of creative careers, with a current focus on mental health and wellbeing in the music industry. He is based at Goldsmiths, University of London and the University of Westminster.

Musgrave is also a rapper and performs under the stage-name of Context. He released his debut mixtape Dialectics in 2008, Mental Breakdown Music in 2009, and the EPs Stealing My Older Brother's Tapes and Hindsight is the Purest Form of Romance in 2014.

Early life and education
Musgrave went to Wymondham College from 2000-2005, and achieved a first-class degree in Social and Political Sciences at the University of Cambridge in 2009. He then went on to do an MA in Politics, Philosophy and Economics in 2010 and completed his ESRC funded PhD at the Centre for Competition Policy at the University of East Anglia in 2014

Academic career
He is the co-author of Can Music Make You Sick? alongside Sally Anne Gross. This two-part report published in 2016 and 2017, and subsequent book in 2020 published by University of Westminster Press, examined the relationship between mental health conditions (principally anxiety and depression) and the nature of working in the music industry. The book draws on survey and interview data, alongside Jodi Dean's concept of communicative capitalism, to explore how digitalisation and a state of abundant musical production has changed the way in which musicians experience building a career. They suggest that musical ambition is based on a series of status’ rooted in the nature of music as labour (‘the status of work’), how value and reputation is acquired and understood (‘the status of value’) and the impact this comes to have on musicians’ closest relationships (‘the status of relationships’), and that each of these status’ can come to harm the emotional and mental wellbeing of musicians.

The research - described as "the largest known study into mental health and the music industry" - led directly to the establishment of the first 24/7 mental health helpline for musicians - Music Minds Matter - launched by the charity Help Musicians UK in 2017. The research has informed the work of organisations including Communion (Berlin), NHS Wales and the Music Managers Forum, and was supported by music industry figures including Grant Hutchison of Frightened Rabbit, Adam Ficek and Shaun Ryder of the Happy Mondays. Upon release, the book was an Amazon Number 1 Best Seller in the 'Sociology of Work' category.

His research has been featured by media outlets including BBC News, Pitchfork, GQ, The Financial Times, BBC Music Introducing, The New York Times and more. Musgrave has also written articles on mental health for BBC Three and Crack Magazine. He has also published research on the ways in which cultural intermediaries create value for musical work, mental health and wellbeing in the gig economy, autoethnography as a qualitative research methodology for arts researchers, the documentary Avicii – True Stories., defining cultural entrepreneurship, and ethical decision-making by music managers.

Music career
Musgrave began his career in music in 2008 under the stage-name Context whilst enrolled as a student.  After releasing his debut mixtapes Dialectics in 2008 and Mental Breakdown Music in 2009, he gained some recognition for his 2010 single "Off with their Heads" which featured Vertex of Marvell and a cameo from Ed Sheeran. The video was featured on MTV. He then released the single "Listening to Burial" in 2011 which was featured on BBC Radio 1's national playlist.

In 2012, he was the winner of MTV’s Brand New For 2012 unsigned competition, beating Clement Marfo, Charli XCX and Lana Del Rey on the channel’s hotly tipped list. Musgrave was recognised as a "brainy rapper" as he was currently studying his PhD whilst pursuing his rap career in 2012. He released a "Fire in the Booth" freestyle with Charlie Sloth on 26 February 2012. In 2013 he signed a worldwide publishing and songwriting deal with Sony/ATV Publishing/EMI Music Publishing.

He released his four-track EP, Stealing My Older Brother's Tapes in 2014 via free download. It was noted for its intricate social commentary with samples from Goldie, Underworld and Altern8. During this time released the song "Small Town Lad Sentiments" which went on to be remixed by Mike Skinner. It was featured on Context's second EP, Hindsight is the Purest Form of Romance released later in 2014.

In 2015, Musgrave took a break from music to focus on his academic career. However, he returned in 2018 to release the single "Better Than This". This was followed by the single "Take Me Back" in 2019 which featured Great Skies.

Publications 

 Gross, S & Musgrave, G (2016) Can Music Make You Sick? A Study Into the Incidence of Musicians' Mental Health - Part 1: Pilot Survey Report, Help Musicians UK/MusicTank
 Gross, S & Musgrave, G (2017) Can Music Make You Sick? A Study Into the Incidence of Musicians' Mental Health - Part 2: Qualitative Study and Recommendations, Help Musicians UK/MusicTank
 Musgrave, G (2017) Collaborating to Compete: The Role of Cultural Intermediaries in Hypercompetition, International Journal of Music Business Research, Vol.6(2), pp. 41–68
 Gross, S., Musgrave, G & Janciute, L (2018) Well-Being and Mental Health in the Gig Economy: Policy Perspectives on Precarity, CAMRI Policy Briefs, University of Westminster Press
 Musgrave, G (2019) Making Sense of My Creativity: Reflecting On Digital Autoethnography, Journal of Artistic and Creative Education, Vol.13(1), pp. 1–11
 Musgrave, G (2020) Avicii: True Stories - Review, Dancecult: Journal of Electronic Dance Music Culture, Vol.12(1), pp. 94–97
 Gross, S & Musgrave, G (2020) Can Music Make You Sick? Measuring the Price of Musical Ambition, University of Westminster Press
 Athanassiou, D & Musgrave, G (2021) Building a Heavy Metal World: Cultural Entrepreneurship in the Polish People's Republic, Artivate: A Journal of Entrepreneurship in the Arts, Vol.10(1), pp. 1–19
 Chaparro, G & Musgrave, G (2021) Moral Music Management: Ethical Decision-Making After Avicii, International Journal of Music Business Research, Vol.10(1), pp. 1–14

Discography

Extended plays
2008: Dialectics 
2009: Mental Breakdown Music 
2014: Stealing My Older Brother's Tapes
2014: Hindsight is the Purest Form of Romance

References 

Living people
Year of birth missing (living people)
Researchers in organizational studies
Academics of Goldsmiths, University of London
Academics of the University of London
21st-century English singers
English male singers
British hip hop singers
Rappers from London
Academics from Norwich
British consciousness researchers and theorists
People educated at Wymondham College
Alumni of the University of Cambridge
Alumni of the University of East Anglia
21st-century British male singers